Chitato is a municipality of the province of Lunda Norte, in Angola. The population is 195,136 (2014 census). The municipality consists of the communes Luachimo and Dundo-Chitato.

It is served by Chitato Airport.

References

Municipalities of Angola
Populated places in Lunda Norte Province